Erie Township may refer to:

 Erie Township, Whiteside County, Illinois
 Erie Township, Miami County, Indiana
 Erie Township, Neosho County, Kansas, in Neosho County, Kansas
 Erie Township, Sedgwick County, Kansas
 Erie Township, Michigan
 Erie Township, Becker County, Minnesota
 Erie Township, Ottawa County, Ohio
 Erie Township, Cass County, North Dakota, in Cass County, North Dakota

Township name disambiguation pages